Steven Mitchell (born 10 February 1970 in Dorking, Surrey) is a British sailor. He competed at the 2004 Summer Olympics in Athens and finished 6th in the double-handed Star class with Iain Percy.

The same team won the 2002 Star World Championships in Los Angeles, and medalled in the next three world championships and won the gold medal at the 2005 European Championship. They were also number one in the ISAF sailing world rankings in 2003.

References

1970 births
Living people
British male sailors (sport)
People from Dorking
Sailors at the 2004 Summer Olympics – Star
Olympic sailors of Great Britain
Etchells class world champions
Star class world champions
World champions in sailing for Great Britain